is a private university, located in the city of Iwaki, Fukushima, Japan.

History
Iwaki Meisei University was established in 1987 with an undergraduate School of Science and Technology and School of Humanities. A graduate (master's) program was initiated from 1992, and a doctoral program from 1994. A School of Pharmacy was established in 2007. In 2019, Iwaki Meisei University was renamed to Iryo Sosei University.

Faculties

Undergraduate
School of Science and Technology
School of Humanities
School of Pharmacy

Graduate
Graduate School of Science and Technology
Graduate School of Humanities

External links
  

Educational institutions established in 1987
Private universities and colleges in Japan
Universities and colleges in Fukushima Prefecture
1987 establishments in Japan
Iwaki, Fukushima